Sunder may refer to:

Sunder (actor) or Sunder Singh (1908-1992), an actor in Punjabi and Hindi films
Sunder (comics), a fictional character in the Marvel Universe
Sunder (Transformers), a character from the Transformers franchise
Sundar or Sunder, an Indian given name (including a list of persons with the name)

See also
Sunder Nagar, a region in Mumbai, Maharashtra, India
Sundre (disambiguation)